Schizolobium amazonicum is a tree species in the family Fabaceae. It is present in the lowland Amazon forest of Bolivia, Brazil, Ecuador, Peru and Venezuela.

References 

Caesalpinioideae
Trees of Bolivia
Trees of Ecuador
Trees of Peru
Trees of Brazil
Trees of Venezuela